Tbilisi, I Love You ( Tbilisi, miq’varkhar) is a 2014 anthology film starring an ensemble cast of actors of various nationalities and part of Emmanuel Benbihy’s Cities Of Love franchise that started with Paris, je t'aime and New York, I Love You.

The film consists of a series of 10 short films written and directed by natives of Georgia, and take on a personal narrative about the republic's capital city. Malcolm McDowell and Ron Perlman both feature. McDowell's vignette centers on an actor who reluctantly agrees to a one-month shoot in Tbilisi and develops a love affair with the city. Perlman's short features him as a nameless American motorcyclist who rides through Tbilisi's remote areas with a woman named Freedom.

Cast
 Malcolm McDowell as Mr. M
 Ron Perlman as nameless rider
 George Finn as Sandro
 Sarah Dumont as Freedom
 Nutsa Kukhianidze as Nana
 Ia Sukhitashvili  as actress
 Tinatin Dalakishvilil as actress

References

External links
 
 
 

2014 films
Drama films from Georgia (country)
Anthology films
English-language films from Georgia (country)
Films shot in Tbilisi
Films set in Tbilisi
2014 in Georgia (country)
2010s in Tbilisi